M. D. Rajendran is an Indian musical artist and lyricist. His debut film was Mochanam in 1979.

Filmography

As a lyricist
 Mochanam (1979)
 Shalini Ente Koottukari (1980)
 Swathu (1980)
 Theekkali (1981)
 Kadhayariyathe (1981)
 Paarvathy (1981)
 Oru Swakaaryam (1983)
 Mangalam Nerunnu (1984)
 Koodum Thedi (1985)
 Adhyayam Onnumuthal (1985)
 Akalathe Ambili (1985)
 Ariyaathe (1986)
 Oru Kadha Oru Nunakkadha (1986)
 Manjamandaarangal (1987)
 Chaithram(1989)
 Ammaavanu Pattiya Amali (1989)
 Aaram Vardil Aabhyanthara Kalaham (1990)
 Aagneyam (1993)
 Saakshyam (1995)
 Devaraagam (1996)
 Anubhoothi (1997)
 Shaanthipuram Thampuraan (1997)
 Over To Delhi (1997)
 Manjeeradhwani (1998)
 Amma Ammaayiyamma (1998)
 Neelanjanam (1998)
 Manassil Oru Manjuthulli (2000)
 Praja (2001)
 Grand Mother (2002)
 Anyar (2003)
 Koottu (2004)
 The Campus (2005)
 Thaskaraveeran (2005)
 Gopaalapuraanam (2008)
 Mounam (2009)
 Black Stallion (2009)
 Pramani (2010)
 Ammanilavu (2010)

As a music composer
 Over To Delhi (1997)
 Neelaanjanam (1998)
 Grand Mother (2002)
 Mounam (2009)
 Ammanilavu (2010)

As a screenplay writer, director, script writer, singer and dialogue writer
 Ammanilavu (2010)

Awards
 2014: Kerala Sangeetha Nataka Akademi Award

References

Living people
Malayalam-language lyricists
People from Thrissur district
Indian lyricists
Film musicians from Kerala
Indian male composers
Musicians from Thrissur
Screenwriters from Kerala
Year of birth missing (living people)
Recipients of the Kerala Sangeetha Nataka Akademi Award